Kwity Paye (born November 19, 1998) is a Liberian professional American football defensive end for the Indianapolis Colts of the National Football League (NFL). He was born in Guinea as a refugee of the First Liberian Civil War and emigrated to the United States as a baby. Paye played college football at Michigan and was drafted by the Colts in the first round of the 2021 NFL Draft.

Early years
Paye was born on November 19, 1998, to a Liberian Krahn mother in a refugee camp in Guinea in the aftermath of the First Liberian Civil War. Named Kwity after his maternal grandfather, who was killed during the war, his mother brought him and his brother Komotay to Providence, Rhode Island in the United States when he was six months old.

He and his brother found an affinity for American football growing up there, with Kwity later attending Bishop Hendricken High School in Warwick, Rhode Island. Playing running back and defensive end, he was named Rhode Island's Gatorade Football Player of the Year as a senior in 2016. Paye originally committed to play college football at Boston College, but later switched to the University of Michigan.

College career
As a true freshman at Michigan in 2017, Paye played in nine games and had five tackles and one sack. As a sophomore in 2018, he started four games and recorded 29 tackles and two sacks. As a junior he started 11 games and finished with 50 tackles and 6.5 sacks. Paye returned to Michigan for his senior year in 2020 but only played in four games due to the season being affected by the COVID-19 pandemic.

Professional career

Paye was drafted by the Indianapolis Colts in the first round (21st overall) of the 2021 NFL Draft. He signed his four-year rookie contract on May 6, 2021.

References

External links
Indianapolis Colts bio
Michigan Wolverines bio

1998 births
Living people
Players of American football from Providence, Rhode Island
American football defensive ends
Michigan Wolverines football players
American people of Liberian descent
African-American players of American football
Indianapolis Colts players
Krahn people
Liberian players of American football
Liberian refugees
21st-century African-American sportspeople
Bishop Hendricken High School alumni